The Health Promotion Board (HPB) is a statutory board under the Ministry of Health of the Government of Singapore. It was established in 2001 to act as the main driver for national health promotion and disease prevention programmes.

School Health Programmes
 Student Health Centre and Student Dental Centre
 Healthy Meals in School Programme

Workplace Health Programmes
 Workplace Outreach Wellness Package

Healthy Food & Dining Programmes
 Healthier Choice Symbol Programme
 Healthier Dining Programme
 Eat, Drink, Shop Healthy Challenge

Physical Activity Programmes
 National Steps Challenge
 MOVE IT! Workouts
 Lose to Win

Preventive Health Programmes
 Screen For Life
 Smoking Cessation Programme

See also 
 Healthcare in Singapore

References

External links
 Official Website of Health Promotion Board
 HealthHub

2001 establishments in Singapore
Government agencies established in 2001
Statutory boards of the Singapore Government
Medical and health organisations based in Singapore
Health education organizations